Tricked may refer to:

 Tricked (British TV series), a British magic television series
 Tricked (Canadian TV series), a Canadian adaptation of the British series
 Tricked (film), a 2013 American documentary film
 Tricked, a 2012 film created during the Entertainment Experience
 "Tricked", a song by Royce da 5'9" from the 2020 album The Allegory
 Tricked (novel), a 2012 novel by Kevin Hearne
 Tricked (graphic novel), a graphic novel by Alex Robinson
 "Tricked (That's the Way I Like It)", a song by God Lives Underwater

See also
 Trick (disambiguation)